Elfa Rún Kristinsdóttir (born 1985) is an Icelandic violinist. Elfa Rún came to international prominence through her victory at the International Johann Sebastian Bach Competition in Leipzig in 2006, where she won the Grand Prize, the Audience Prize and a special prize awarded to the youngest finalist. Elfa Rún has also won several awards at the Icelandic Music Awards, including the Performer of the Year award in 2012 and the Album of the Year award in 2015 for her recording of the works of Georg Philipp Telemann. In 2015, Elfa Rún was nominated for the Nordic Council Music Prize Elfa Rún's work in historically informed performance of Baroque music has been well received, and she is an active member of Akademie für Alte Musik Berlin. After finishing her studies in her native Iceland with a diploma from Iceland Academy of the Arts, Elfa studied in Freiburg and Leipzig under the tutelage of Rainer Kussmaul an Carolin Widmann.

References 

Icelandic violinists
1985 births
Living people
21st-century violinists